Feu or FEU may refer to:

 Feu (album), by French hip hop artist Nekfeu
 Feu (food), a stew or noodle soup from Laos
 Feu (land tenure)
 Far East University (Taiwan), a university in Tainan, Taiwan
 Far Eastern University, a university in the Philippines
 Federation of Entertainment Unions, a British trade union
 Forty-foot Equivalent Unit
 Limi Feu (born Limi Yamamoto, 1974), Japanese fashion designer
 Fibrinogen equivalent units of D-dimer

See also
 Feux, a commune in the Cher department in the Centre region of France